Florencia Borelli (born 30 October 1992) is an Argentine middle- and long-distance runner. She won a gold medal in the 5000 metres at the 2019 South American Championships in addition to winning multiple other medals at continental level.

Her twin sister, Mariana Borelli, is also a runner.

International competitions

Personal bests
Outdoor
1500 metres – 4:15.41 (Huelva 2019)
3000 metres – 8:53.89 (Memphis 2022)
5000 metres – 15:23.83 (Manchester 2022) NR
10,000 metres – 33:53.58 (Rosario 2018)
10 kilometres – 34:21 (San Bernardo 2017)
15 kilometres – 55:52 (Mar del Plata 2017)
Half marathon – 1:13:10 (Valencia 2018)

References

1992 births
Living people
Argentine female middle-distance runners
Argentine female long-distance runners
Athletes (track and field) at the 2010 South American Games
Athletes (track and field) at the 2018 South American Games
Athletes (track and field) at the 2019 Pan American Games
Pan American Games competitors for Argentina
South American Championships in Athletics winners
21st-century Argentine women